Edward Adair Wilson (born August 14, 1940) is a former American football quarterback and punter in the American Football League (AFL). He played college football at the University of Arizona and professionally for the Dallas Texans/Kansas City Chiefs and the Boston Patriots. He coached for Arizona, Army, Cornell, Duke, Florida State, Georgia Tech, Wake Forest, and the Kansas City Chiefs.

See also
 List of NCAA major college football yearly passing leaders
 List of American Football League players

References

External links
 

1940 births
Living people
American Football League players
American football punters
American football quarterbacks
Arizona Wildcats football coaches
Arizona Wildcats football players
Army Black Knights football coaches
Boston Patriots players
Cornell Big Red football coaches
Dallas Texans (AFL) players
Duke Blue Devils football coaches
Florida State Seminoles football coaches
Georgia Tech Yellow Jackets football coaches
Kansas City Chiefs coaches
Kansas City Chiefs players
Wake Forest Demon Deacons football coaches
People from Redding, California
Players of American football from California